Whitney Webber (born February 23, 1978) is an American rower. In the 2003 World Rowing Championships, she won a gold medal in the women's coxless four event.

Webber attended the University of California and Dartmouth College where she majored in Integrative biology and environmental sciences and competed in NCAA rowing events.

References

See also
 

1978 births
Living people
American female rowers
World Rowing Championships medalists for the United States
University of California alumni
Sportspeople from California
21st-century American women